is a Japanese pop singer and model. She is a fourth-generation member of the idol pop group Angerme.

Biography
Moe Kamikokuryo was born on October 24, 1999, in Kumamoto Prefecture, Japan.

In November 2015, Kamikokuryo was chosen as the sole fourth-generation member of Angerme.

In March 2017, Kamikokuryo joined Satoyama movement's new group, Kamiishinaka Kana, alongside Saki Nakajima, Ayumi Ishida and Tomoko Kanazawa.

From 2019 to present day, Kamikokuryo models for fashion brand Evelyn.

Discography
for Moe Kamikokuryo's releases with Angerme, see Angerme#Discography.

Solo songs
"Michiko no Uta" (2016)
"Color Girl" (2018)

Bibliography

Photobooks
Moe (October 24, 2018, Odyssey Books)

Filmography

Movies
JK Ninja Girls (2017)
A Turtle's Shell Is a Human's Ribs (2022), Flami (voice)

Television shows
The Girls Live (2015–2019)
Bowling Kakumei P★League (ボウリング革命 P★League) (2017–present)
Ai・Dol Project (Ai・Dol プロジェクト) (2019)
Hello! Project presents... "Solo Fes!" (2020)
Angerme no Kekkyoku wa Love desho!! (2020)
Hiru nan desu! (ヒルナンデス!) (2021)
Hello! Project presents... "Solo Fes! 2" (2021)

References

External links

1999 births
Living people
Angerme members
Japanese female idols
Japanese women pop singers
Japanese female models
Musicians from Kumamoto Prefecture